Piz Quattervals (Romansh lit. "peak of the four valleys") is a mountain of the Livigno Alps, located in Graubünden, Switzerland. With a height of 3,165 metres above sea level, Piz Quattervals is the highest mountain of the chain north of Pass Chaschauna. Its mass lies between four valleys: Val Tantermozza, Valletta, Val Sassa and Val Müschauns, although its summit lies between the first three mentioned. Piz Quattervals is the highest accessible peak within the Swiss National Park.

See also
List of mountains of Graubünden
List of most isolated mountains of Switzerland

References

External links
 Piz Quattervals on Hikr
 Piz Quattervals on Summitpost

Mountains of Graubünden
Mountains of the Alps
Alpine three-thousanders
Mountains of Switzerland
Zernez